Triton Point is a rocky headland forming the east end of the high ridge separating Venus Glacier and Neptune Glacier on the east coast of Alexander Island, Antarctica. The coast in this vicinity was first seen from the air by Lincoln Ellsworth on 23 November 1935, and was roughly mapped from photos obtained on that flight by W.L.G. Joerg. The point was roughly surveyed in 1936 by the British Graham Land Expedition and more accurately defined in 1949 by the Falkland Islands Dependencies Survey. Named by the United Kingdom Antarctic Place-Names Committee for its association with nearby Neptune Glacier, Triton being one of the satellites of the planet Neptune, the eighth planet of the Solar System.

See also

 Belemnite Point
 Dykeman Point
 Rossini Point

Headlands of Alexander Island